Joseph Toland (December 22, 1928 – July 18, 2002) was an American rower. He competed in the men's coxed pair event at the 1948 Summer Olympics.

References

External links
 

1928 births
2002 deaths
American male rowers
Olympic rowers of the United States
Rowers at the 1948 Summer Olympics
Rowers from Philadelphia
Pan American Games medalists in rowing
Pan American Games gold medalists for the United States
Pan American Games silver medalists for the United States
Rowers at the 1955 Pan American Games